The 2008 FIBA Europe Under-20 Championship for Women was the seventh edition of the Women's European basketball championship for national under-20 teams. It was held in Chieti, Sulmona and Pescara, Italy, from 11 to 20 July 2008. Russia women's national under-20 basketball team won the tournament and became the European champions for the fourth time.

Participating teams

  (Winners, 2007 FIBA Europe Under-20 Championship for Women Division B)
  (Runners-up, 2007 FIBA Europe Under-20 Championship for Women Division B)

First round
In the first round, the teams were drawn into four groups of four. The first three teams from each group advance to the quarterfinal round, the last teams will play in the classification round for 13th–16th place.

Group A

Group B

Group C

Group D

Quarterfinal round
In this round, the teams play in two groups of six. The first two teams from each group advance to the semifinals, the third and fourth teams advance to the 5th–8th place playoffs, the other teams will play in the 9th–12th place playoffs.

Group E

Group F

Classification round for 13th–16th place

Group G

9th–12th place playoffs

9th–12th place semifinals

11th place match

9th place match

5th–8th place playoffs

5th–8th place semifinals

7th place match

5th place match

Championship playoffs

Semifinals

3rd place match

Final

Final standings

References

2008
2008–09 in European women's basketball
International youth basketball competitions hosted by Italy
FIBA U20
July 2008 sports events in Europe